Rajendra Kumar (born 1960) is a leading politician and member of the Bahujan Samaj Party (BSP) in India. Active in politics from his college days, he was first elected Cabinet Minister in the BSP government in 1995. He has been a Member of The Legislative Assembly (MLA) since 2007 serving the Muhammadabad Gohna constituency in Mau District. Since 2008 he has been working as Bihar pradesh prabhari (BSP).

References

Living people
Members of the Uttar Pradesh Legislative Assembly
Bahujan Samaj Party politicians from Uttar Pradesh
1960 births